Parabitecta is a genus of moths in the subfamily Arctiinae. It contains the single species Parabitecta flava, which is found in China.

References

Natural History Museum Lepidoptera generic names catalog

Lithosiini